Da Dick and Dom Dairies (pronounced "diaries") is a compilation series of all the "Best-Bits" from Dick & Dom in da Bungalow. It began airing during weekday mornings on BBC Two from Monday 26 January to Friday 20 February 2009 and featured newly recorded material from the original cast and the creamy muck muck finale towards the end of each episode.

Regular segments

Game or No Game in which Little Noely (a parody of Noel Edmonds played by Ian Kirkby who appeared in the Bungalow on two occasions) presents a parody of Deal or No Deal in order to determine whether or not a game will be shown or not. Little Noely invited viewers to pick one of two boxes. We are led to believe that if the "No Game" box is picked the show will end. If the "Game" box is picked the name of the game shown in the box is played.
 Good Game Good Game Gamey Game Game in which parodies of Bruce Forsyth and Tess Daly pick random cards each enlisting a game until a pair is found. The game which is the subject of the pair is subsequently shown, after "Bruce" says "What do we do with a pair?" and "Tess" says something like "Eat it!" (referring to the fruit). For some reason in this feature Tess Daly is just a mini spinning cardboard cut out which talks with a gruff northern accent!
 Batt Files in which Harry Batt interrogates former Bungalow Heads and relives classic Bungalow moments. The Prize Idiot also features who we are now told is a police constable working for DI Batt.
Good Bungalows Go Bad – Melvin Odoom features in a sketch in which he relieves some of his personal favourite Bungalow moments.

BBC children's television shows